Anatol Vidrașcu (born 2 April 1949) is an editor and activist from Moldova. He serves as CEO of the Editorial Group "Litera" and is a leader of the Democratic Forum of Romanians in Moldova.

Biography
Anatol Vidrașcu graduated from the Moldova State University in 1975. Between 1975 and 1989 he worked for "Literatura artistică" publishing house. On 3 May 1989 he created the Editorial Group "Litera". Since 1989, the group has published over 1500 titles.

Anatol Vidrașcu is the president of the European Cultural Institute. He served as a leader of the Liberal Party.

Awards
 National Order "Faithful Service", Romania, 2000

References

External links 
 Anatol Vidraşcu. Editorul vieţii sale
 Anatol Vidrascu, director general al Grupului Editorial Litera

1949 births
Moldovan writers
Moldovan male writers
Moldovan activists
Moldovan journalists
Male journalists
People from Ungheni District
Moldovan editors
Living people